Saskia Wummelsdorf Fischer (born 2 May 1980) is a German female badminton player. She has competed in the 1997, 2005, 2009 and 2013 Summer Deaflympics.

Wummelsdorf has won 3 medals in her Deaflympic career including a gold medal.

See also 
Badminton at the Deaflympics

References 

1980 births
Living people
German female badminton players
Deaf badminton players
German deaf people
Competitors at the 1997 Summer Deaflympics
Competitors at the 2005 Summer Deaflympics
Competitors at the 2009 Summer Deaflympics
Competitors at the 2013 Summer Deaflympics
Medalists at the 1997 Summer Deaflympics
Medalists at the 2005 Summer Deaflympics
Deaflympic gold medalists for Germany
Deaflympic silver medalists for Germany